Perixera absconditaria is a moth of the family Geometridae first described by Francis Walker in 1862. It is found in the Indian subregion, Sri Lanka, to Taiwan, Sundaland and the Philippines.

It is a pale brownish moth. Two white spots can be seen in the middle of the hindwings. The caterpillar is known to feed on Cinnamomum species.

Two subspecies are recognized.
Perixera absconditaria assamica Prout, 1938
Perixera absconditaria conjectata Prout, 1938

References

Moths of Asia
Moths described in 1862